Yusleinis Herrera Álvarez (born 12 March 1984) is a Cuban volleyball player who competed in the 2008 Summer Olympics.

In 2008 she finished fourth with the Cuban team in the Olympic tournament.

References

External links
 FIVB profile
 

1984 births
Living people
Cuban women's volleyball players
Olympic volleyball players of Cuba
Volleyball players at the 2008 Summer Olympics
Pan American Games medalists in volleyball
Pan American Games gold medalists for Cuba
Volleyball players at the 2007 Pan American Games
Medalists at the 2007 Pan American Games